The 2017 Mallorca Open was a women's tennis tournament played on grass courts. It was the 2nd edition of the Mallorca Open, and part of the International category of the 2017 WTA Tour. It took place at Santa Ponsa Tennis Club in Majorca, Spain, from June 19 through June 25, 2017.

Points and prize money

Point distribution

Prize money

WTA singles main-draw entrants

Seeds

 1 Rankings are as of Jun 12, 2017.

Other entrants
The following players received wildcards into the main draw:
 Victoria Azarenka
 Sabine Lisicki 
 Francesca Schiavone
 Sara Sorribes Tormo

The following players received entry from the qualifying draw:
 Verónica Cepede Royg
 Jana Čepelová
 Kirsten Flipkens 
 Beatriz Haddad Maia
 Ons Jabeur 
 Anna Kalinskaya

The following player received entry as a lucky loser:
  Sara Errani

Withdrawals
Before the tournament
  Annika Beck →replaced by  Mandy Minella
  Anett Kontaveit →replaced by  Sara Errani
  Monica Niculescu →replaced by  Risa Ozaki
  Laura Siegemund →replaced by  Varvara Lepchenko

Retirements
  Kiki Bertens

WTA doubles main-draw entrants

Seeds

1 Rankings are as of 12 June 2017.

Other entrants 
The following pairs received wildcards into the doubles main draw:
  Eugenie Bouchard /  Sabine Lisicki
  Verónica Cepede Royg /  Sara Sorribes Tormo

Withdrawals
During the tournament
  Julia Görges (gastrointestinal illness)
  Anastasija Sevastova

Champions

Singles 

  Anastasija Sevastova def.  Julia Görges, 6–4, 3–6, 6–3

Doubles 

  Chan Yung-jan /  Martina Hingis def.  Jelena Janković /  Anastasija Sevastova, walkover

References

External links 
 

Mallorca Open
Mallorca Open
2017